NGC 3191 (also known as NGC 3192) is a barred spiral galaxy in the constellation Ursa Major. It is located at a distance of circa 400 million light years from Earth, which, given its apparent dimensions, means that NGC 3191 is about 115,000 light years across. The galaxy has been distorted and interacts with a companion 1.3 armin to the west. An extremely blue tidal bridge lies between them.

Two supernovae have been observed in NGC 3191, SN 1988B and SN 2017egm. SN 1988B was discovered by P. Wild 10" north of the galaxy's center. On Jan. 18.94 and 21.85 UT, it was at mag about 15.5. It was a type Ia supernova. SN 2017egm is identified as a Type I superluminous supernova. It is the closest supernova of this type observed and also the first to be found in a massive spiral galaxy. It was discovered by Gaia on 23 May 2017.

References

External links 

Barred spiral galaxies
Ursa Major (constellation)
3191
05565
30136